68 is an American noise rock duo from Atlanta, Georgia. Formed in 2013 by guitarist and vocalist Josh Scogin—formerly of the hardcore punk band the Chariot—and drummer Michael McClellan, the band currently comprises Scogin and drummer Nikko Yamada.

History

Josh Scogin's former band, the Chariot, played their final show in November 2013. Just over a week later, Scogin teased an announcement with a countdown timer on the website theyare68.com; when the timer ended in December 2013, Scogin revealed that he had formed a new band named '68 and posted a two-song EP, Midnight, for sale online. The title of the EP and its two songs—"Three Is a Crowd" and "Third Time Is a Charm"—are significant to Scogin; the use of the number three in the song titles represents the third act of his life following his stints in Norma Jean and the Chariot, and Scogin also explained that three represents "that thought process of continuing on in my head: 'Three's a charm,' oh, this is gonna be great or 'three's a crowd,' like we should've stuck with the Chariot." The initial pressing of Midnight sold out in less than one day; independent record label No Sleep Records re-released it with new artwork on 1 April 2014.

The band toured in April and May 2014, opening for Chiodos, Emarosa, Our Last Night, and Hands Like Houses, and in May 2014 announced their signing to Good Fight Music and eOne Music to release their debut album In Humor and Sadness, which was released two months later on 8 July 2014. To promote the album, the band released "Track Two: e" on YouTube as a pair videos that had to be played in unison in order to hear the song correctly. Scogin said of releasing the song this way: "[S]omeone will have one computer and invite a friend over that has another computer, they will spend several minutes struggling and laughing at trying to sync up the two videos perfectly." The song "Track One: R" was also available for online streaming ahead of the album's release, and in August, they released a music video for "Track One: R" directed by former Norma Jean and Underoath member Daniel Davison. The band's first tour in support of In Humor and Sadness featured Listener (whose vocalist Dan Smith previously guested on the Chariot's 2010 album, Long Live) and Homeless Gospel Choir.

Scogin and McClellan entered the studio in January 2016 to work on their second album, and a few months later posted a demo from the then-upcoming album to YouTube on 14 March 2016. The album, Two Parts Viper, was released over a year later on 2 June 2017.

A few months after the release of Two Parts Viper, McClellan was revealed to have parted ways with Scogin. During the tour, Nikko Yamada replaced McClellan as the band's new drummer.

In September 2020, the band released their second EP, Love Is Ain't Dead.

In January 2021, they announced their third album, Give One Take One, which was released on March 26.

Members
Current members
 Josh Scogin – vocals, guitar (2013–present)
 Nikko Yamada – drums (2017–present)

Former members
 Michael McClellan – drums (2013–2017)

Discography

Studio albums

EPs
 Midnight (2013, self-released)
 Love Is Ain't Dead (2020)

Compilation appearances

Warped Tour 2015 Compilation – "The Human Calculus" (2015, SideOneDummy)

Music videos
 "Track 1 R" (2014)
 Directed by Daniel Davison
 "Track 2 E" (2014)
 "Track 5 E" (2014)
 "Track 7 N" (2015)
 "Track 9 T" (2015)
 "The Workers Are Few" (2017)
 "Eventually We All Win" (2017)
 "Whether Terrified or Unafraid" (2018)
 "Without Any Words (Only Crying and Laughter)" (2018)
 "Bad Bite" (2021)
 "The Knife, The Knife, The Knife" (2021)

References

External links

Musical groups from Atlanta
2013 establishments in Georgia (U.S. state)
Musical groups established in 2013
Rock music duos
American post-hardcore musical groups
Punk rock groups from Georgia (U.S. state)